Full Force Get Busy 1 Time! is the second album by the Brooklyn, New York-based R&B group Full Force.  Released in 1986, the album includes one of Full Force's biggest hits with "Temporary Love Thing", which nearly made the R&B top 10, as well as the minor follow-up hits, "Unfaithful" and "Old Flames Never Die".

Track listing
"Temporary Love Thing" (5:35)	
"Unfaithful" (5:49)
"Never Had Another Lover" (4:37)	
"Old Flames Never Die" (4:56) 	
"Child's Play (Part 1)" (0:53)
"So Much" (5:17) 	
"Chain Me to the Night" (4:42)
"Body Heavenly" (5:16)
"Love Scene" (4:52) 	
"Child's Play (Part 2)" (0:44)

All songs written, arranged, and performed by Full Force.

Personnel

Full Force
"Lead choice voices": Paul Anthony and Bowlegged Lou
Drum, programming, percussion master, "occasional hogging of lead vocals": B-Fine
Ebony and Ivory keyboards: Baby Gerry
Slick lick leading guitar: Curt-t-t
Atlanta June bass geetar: Shy Shy
Background vocal chords: All members of Full Force

"Extra added attractions"
Hitman Howie Tee - additional drum programming; turntable scratching on "Unfaithful", "Never Had Another Lover", "So Much" and "Chain Me to the Night"
Lisa Lisa - female vocals on "Love Scene"
Ron Brown - voiced guitar on "So Much" and "Old Flames Never Die"

Charts

Singles

References

External links
 Full Force-Get Busy 1 Time! at Discogs

1986 albums
Full Force albums
Columbia Records albums
Albums produced by Full Force